Anna Mkapa (born Anna Joseph Maro) served as the third First Lady of Tanzania from 1995 to 2005. She is the widow of former President Benjamin Mkapa.

First Lady of Tanzania (1995-2005) 
As First Lady of Tanzania, Anna Mkapa was a strong advocate for improving the lives of children and women. In 1997, she founded the nonprofit Equal Opportunity for All Trust Fund (EOTF). She promoted women's economic, social, and political status. She helped female entrepreneurs,  increased female representation in parliament, and ensured maternal healthcare and reproductive rights were included in the White Ribbon Alliance's healthcare initiative. The public affectionately referred to her as "Mama Mkapa" and "Dada (sister in Swahili) Mkapa".

Honours and awards

Awards
1999: Graven Award by Wartburg College
2016: Order of the Smile Award

Honorary degrees
Briar Cliff College, Honorary degree, 1999
Wartburg College, Doctor of Humane Letters, 2002

References

First Ladies of Tanzania
Living people
Year of birth missing (living people)